Boundary Road may refer to:

 Boundary Road or Boundary Street, the former name of Florida Avenue in Washington DC
 Boundary Road Brewery, a craft beer brand produced by Independent Breweries NZ
 Boundary Road (Ottawa), in the Nepean—Carleton electoral district of Ontario, Canada

See also
 
 Boundary Street, Kowloon, Hong Kong